The 1991 Women's Hockey Champions Trophy was the third edition of the Hockey Champions Trophy for women. The tournament took place from September 13 to September 21, 1991, in the Olympiastadion in Berlin, Germany.

Australia won the tournament for the first time, finishing atop the pool standings, above Germany and Netherlands who finished second and third respectively.

Participating nations

Head coach: Brian Glencross

Head coach: Zhang Qingyou

Head coach: Rüdiger Hänel

Head coach: Roelant Oltmans

Head coach: Kim Chang-Baek

Head coach: José Brasa

Results

Pool standings

Matches

Statistics

Final standings

Goalscorers

References

FIH Media Guide

External links

Women's Hockey Champions Trophy
Champions Trophy
International women's field hockey competitions hosted by Germany
Hockey Champions Trophy
Sports competitions in Berlin
Hockey Champions Trophy
Hockey Champions Trophy